Dactylonia holthuisi is a small shrimp in the family Palaemonidae, first described by Charles Fransen in 2002. The species epithet honours Lipke Holthuis.

It is known from Ambon and Bali, where it was collected from an aggregate of ascidians of Plurella species.

References

Palaemonoidea
Crustaceans of the Pacific Ocean
Crustaceans described in 2002
Taxa named by Charles Fransen